Boris A. Novak (born 3 December 1953) is a Slovene poet, dramaturge and editor. 

Novak was born in 1953 in Belgrade where he also spent his early childhood. He completed secondary schooling in Ljubljana and studied Comparative literature and Philosophy at the University of Ljubljana and worked as a dramaturge at the Slovene National Theatre and as a lecturer at the University. He has also been involved in humanitarian work and was in 2002 elected vice-president of International PEN.

He won the Prešeren Foundation Award in 1984 for his poetry collection 1001 stih (1001 verses). and the Jenko Award in 1995 for the collection Mojster nespečnosti (Master of Insomnia).

Poetry collections

 Stihožitje, (1977)
 Hči spomina, (1981)
 1001 stih, (1983)
 Kronanje,(1984)
 Vrtnar tišine - Gardener of Silence, bilingual collection (1990)
 Oblike sveta, (1991)
 Stihija, (1991)
 Mojster nespečnosti, (1995)
 Oblike srca, (1997)
 Odsotnost, (1999)
 Alba, (1999)
 Odmev, (2000)
 Žarenje, (2003)
 Obredi slovesa, (2005)

Poetry for children
 Prebesedimo besede!, (1981)
 Domišljija je povsod doma, (1984)
 Periskop, (1989)
 Blabla, (1995)
 Zarja časa, (1997)
 Čarovnije sveta, (1999)
 Kako rastejo stvari, (2004)

References

Slovenian poets
Slovenian male poets
Slovenian editors
Living people
1953 births
Writers from Belgrade
University of Ljubljana alumni
Academic staff of the University of Ljubljana
Dramaturges